The 1973–74 Chicago Cougars season was the Chicago Cougars' second season of operation in the World Hockey Association. The team qualified for the playoff and won two playoff series to make it to the Avco Cup Final before losing to the Houston Aeros.

Offseason
The Chicago Cougars revamped their lineup during the off-season in hopes of escaping the cellar.
The Cougars strengthened their defense by signing National Hockey League all-star defenceman Pat Stapleton from the Chicago Blackhawks as a player-coach, Darryl Maggs from the California Golden Seals and goaltender Cam Newton from the Pittsburgh Penguins. 
To the forward line, the Cougars signed Ralph Backstrom, also from the Blackhawks, Eric Nesterenko, who had spent a season in Switzerland after a long career with the Blackhawks and Maple Leafs, and junior all-star Frank Rochon from the Sherbrooke Beavers, and acquired Joe Hardy from the Cleveland Crusaders and Duke Harris from the Houston Aeros.

Regular season
The Cougars scored 26 more goals than the previous season and reduced the goals against by 22 to post a 50% improvement in points and secure the final playoff spot in the East Division by a single point over the Quebec Nordiques.

Final standings

Game log

Playoffs

Chicago Cougars 4, New England Whalers 3 - Division Quarterfinals

Chicago Cougars 4, Toronto Toros 3 - Semifinals

Houston Aeros 4, Chicago Cougars 0 - Avco Cup Finals

Player stats

Note: Pos = Position; GP = Games played; G = Goals; A = Assists; Pts = Points; +/- = plus/minus; PIM = Penalty minutes; PPG = Power-play goals; SHG = Short-handed goals; GWG = Game-winning goals
      MIN = Minutes played; W = Wins; L = Losses; T = Ties; GA = Goals-against; GAA = Goals-against average; SO = Shutouts;

Awards and records

Transactions

Trades

Draft picks
Chicago's draft picks at the 1973 WHA Amateur Draft.

Farm teams

See also
1973–74 WHA season

References

External links

Chic
Chic
Chicago Cougars seasons